was a vice admiral in the Imperial Japanese Navy. In retirement he served as President of Mitsubishi Shipbuilding and of Mitsubishi Electric.

Biography
Takeda graduated from the Imperial Japanese Naval Academy, which he later headed in 1913. Between 1890 and 1894 he studied in France, and afterwards visited France and its colonies several times with various naval missions. After returning to Japan in 1894 Takeda fought in the First Sino-Japanese War on board of Japanese cruiser Itsukushima. His further career was mostly devoted to engineering, teaching, and administration. He was eventually promoted to rear admiral in 1909 and to vice admiral in 1913.

After retiring from military service in 1914, Takeda became an advisor for the Mitsubishi Corporation. He then served as President of Mitsubishi Shipbuilding and of Mitsubishi Electric.

References

1863 births
1942 deaths
Imperial Japanese Navy admirals
Japanese military personnel of the First Sino-Japanese War
Mitsubishi Electric people